Zimmer mit Blick (English: Room with a View) is the fifth studio album by German band Revolverheld. Their first regular album in five years, it was released by Sony BMG on 13 April 2018 in German-speaking Europe.

Track listing

Charts

Certifications

References

2018 albums
German-language albums
Revolverheld albums